The 2015–16 season was the 130th in the history of Luton Town Football Club and the club's 90th season in the Football League. Following their eighth-place finish the previous year, Luton were contesting the season in League Two.

Key events
2 June: Luton confirm they have agreed an undisclosed "six-figure" transfer fee for Norwich City midfielder Cameron McGeehan, who will join the club on a two-year contract on 1 July.
30 June: Mark Cullen, the club's top scorer in the previous season, joins League One side Blackpool for £180,000.
1 August: Former Brighton & Hove Albion forward Craig Mackail-Smith signs a two-year contract with Luton after being on trial with the club for over a month.
8 August: Luton begin their 2015–16 campaign with a 1–1 draw away to Accrington Stanley.
24 August: Luton are knocked out of the League Cup at the second round, losing 8–7 in a penalty shootout to Premier League side Stoke City after the game finished 1–1 at extra time.
24 August: Following Brentford's sale of former Luton striker Andre Gray to Burnley, Luton confirm that they will receive £1.1 million in sell-on fees spread over three seasons. Additionally, Luton reveal that if Burnley win promotion to the Premier League with Gray in the side, the club would be due a further £700,000. The potential total value of Gray's transfer, including the fee Brentford paid in June 2014, makes this one of the most lucrative transfers in Luton Town history.
25 August: Striker Jack Marriott signs a new contract to keep him at Luton until the summer of 2017, with the option of extending his deal until 2019.
30 August: Luton's Managing Director Gary Sweet confirms the club is in the final process of buying a  plot of land near Junction 10a of the M1 for £10 million to potentially house a new stadium, or to act as an enabling development to a stadium elsewhere in Luton.
5 September: Luton win their first league game of the season at the sixth time of asking, beating Cambridge United 3–1 at the Abbey Stadium.
22 September: After impressing in his first six games for the club, midfielder Olly Lee signs an extended contract with Luton until June 2017.
3 October: Luton record their biggest Football League away victory since March 2005, winning 4–1 at Hartlepool United to lift the club to tenth in the table.
6 October: Luton are knocked out of the Football League Trophy at the second round following a 2–1 away loss to League One side Gillingham.

Club

Current squad

New contracts

Transfers

Transfers in

Transfers out

Loans out

Overall transfer activity

Spending
Summer:  Undisclosed

Total:  Undisclosed

Income
Summer:  £180,000

Total:  £180,000

Net expenditure
Summer:  Undisclosed  (~ £180,000)

Total:  Undisclosed  (~ £180,000)

Competitions

Pre-season friendlies
On 7 May 2015, Luton Town announced their pre-season schedule. On 23 June 2015, Luton added Farense to the pre-season diary.

League Two

League table

Results by Matchday

Matches
On 17 June 2015, the fixtures for the forthcoming season were announced.

FA Cup

League Cup

Football League Trophy

Appearances and goals
Source:
Numbers in parentheses denote appearances as substitute.
Players with names struck through and marked  left the club during the playing season.
Players with names in italics and marked * were on loan from another club for the whole of their season with Luton.
Players listed with no appearances have been in the matchday squad but only as unused substitutes.
Key to positions: GK – Goalkeeper; DF – Defender; MF – Midfielder; FW – Forward

Honours

Team

Individuals

Players

Manager

References

External links

Luton Town F.C. seasons
Luton Town